Bundesstraße 455 (abbreviated B-455) is a German Bundesstraße (German for "federal highway") in the federal state of Hesse. The route runs southwest from Schotten in Vogelsbergkreis to Mainz-Kastel, a borough of the Hessian capital city of Wiesbaden.

Route
Bundesstraße 455 begins in Schotten in Vogelsbergkreis.  The road continues through the Wetteraukreis, including the municipalities of Nidda, Wölfersheim, Friedberg and Rosbach vor der Höhe. Route 455 merges with Bundesautobahn 5 (A-5) at the Friedberg exit and follows this autobahn to the Bad Homburg interchange. It then follows Bundesautobahn 661 (A-661) to its source in Oberursel-Nord.

Bundesstraße 455 originally went through Bad Homburg vor der Höhe and Friedrichsdorf. These parts of the route were replaced by the A-5 and A-661 sections, and the original highway has now been downgraded to a state road (Landesstraße). Nevertheless, the signs on B-455 from Königstein as well as from Friedberg continue to refer to Bad Homburg.

From Oberursel-Nord, Bundesstraße 455 then takes the so-called "Northern Bypass" (Nordumgehung) around Oberursel. Before this tunnel was built, the route originally went through Oberursel. After its construction, the former route was downgraded to a state road (L 3004) and a district highway (Kreisstraße, K 772).

Bundesstraße 455 then continues through Königstein im Taunus and Eppstein. It crosses the A-3 and enters Wiesbaden's northeast suburbs. Bundesstraße 455 ends at the Rhine River at the Theodor Heuss Bridge in Mainz-Kastel, a borough of Wiesbaden.

Municipalities 
 Hessen
 Vogelsbergkreis
 Schotten
 Wetteraukreis
 Nidda, Wölfersheim, Friedberg (Hessen), Rosbach vor der Höhe
 Hochtaunuskreis
 Friedrichsdorf, Oberursel (Taunus), Königstein im Taunus
 Main-Taunus-Kreis
 Kelkheim (Taunus), Eppstein
 Stadt Wiesbaden

455
Roads in Hesse
Transport in Wiesbaden
Taunus